Michael Bodkin is a GAA inter-county referee. A native of County Galway. He was nominated for the position of assistant secretary for the Galway Hurling Board in 2009.

Fire
The Galway Independent of 8 September 2010 reported that Bodkin was hailed as a hero on Monday after preventing a tragedy as a fire gutted an agricultural business in Co Galway. Former inter-county referee Michael Bodkin raised the alarm and got neighbours to evacuate their houses as fire destroyed a co-op in Abbeyknockmoy where he is manager.

The fire destroyed the Arrabawn Co-Op in Newtown, north County Galway. Bodkin was in time to alert neighbours but the building was destroyed in the fire, but firemen managed to prevent it from spreading to nearby houses. The blaze is believed to have begun shortly after 4 am.

According to Bodkin, There was little the fire brigade could do. It was gone out of control and was blazing. The building is gutted from top to bottom. I went to the McWalters’ house on one side and the Dalys on the other and made sure they were up and did not come to any harm, but the fire brigade managed to stop the fire spreading. It’s an awful thing to come into on a Monday morning. It’s a sad, sad sight. We don’t know yet what caused it, but there was bad lightning during the night. Whether it was that or something electrical, we just don’t know at this stage.

Theft
It was reported that the former manager of Mountbellew Arrabawn Co-op has pleaded guilty to the theft of 57 thousand euro worth of agricultural products from the company. Fifty-six-year-old Michael Bodkin of Corkskeagh, Gurteen, Ballinasloe also pleaded guilty to wasting Garda time and claiming someone else committed the offences. Judge Rory McCabe remanded the accused on continuing bail to appear before the court again on March 13 for sentence.

References

External links
 http://www.hoganstand.com/ArticleForm.aspx?ID=121008
 http://www.independent.ie/sport/wait-continues-for-derry-minors-371310.html
 
 http://www.galwayindependent.com/local-news/local-news/ref-hailed-as-hero/

Year of birth missing (living people)
Living people
Hurling referees